Mountain devil may refer to:

 Lambertia formosa, a proteaceous shrub of the Sydney and Blue Mountains region in Australia
 Moloch horridus, a lizard of inland Australia